Christopher John Hesketh-Harvey (30 April 1957 – 1 February 2023) was a British musical performer, translator, composer, and screenwriter.

Early life 
Born in Zomba, Nyasaland (now Malawi), Rhodesia and Nyasaland, into a Foreign Office family, he was educated as senior chorister at Canterbury Cathedral and then at Tonbridge School in Kent. His sister is Sarah Sands, former editor of the London Evening Standard and the Today programme on BBC Radio 4. He gained an Exhibition in English Literature as well as a choral scholarship to Clare College, Cambridge, where he studied under John Rutter and joined the Footlights.

Career 
Hesketh-Harvey worked as a staff producer for the BBC-TV Music and Arts Department, joining in 1980 and leaving to write the script for Merchant Ivory's Maurice (1987). He won the 1988 Vivian Ellis Award for musical-theatre writers and subsequently studied with Stephen Sondheim, who had been appointed to the Cameron Mackintosh visiting professorship in Contemporary Theatre at St Catherine's College, Oxford.

Hesketh-Harvey worked on the Vicar of Dibley series for the BBC. He wrote Full Throttle, starring Rowan Atkinson, and Hans Andersen: My Life as a Fairytale (Hallmark). He co-wrote the screenplay for Tim Walker's film The Lost Explorer. (Another collaboration with Walker, The Granny Alphabet with his verses to Walker's photographs, was published by Thames and Hudson in 2013). His first detective novel, For The Shooting, was published in October 2017.

Hesketh-Harvey wrote and sang with pianist Richard Sisson for over 30 years, as a musical comedy duo Kit and The Widow. They had a number of West End and Broadway theatre runs and international tours, notably with the late Joan Rivers. They had their own series on BBC Radios 3 and 4, and two TV specials on Channel 4. He starred in the 1996 production of Salad Days at the Vaudeville Theatre, and in Tom Foolery (Jermyn Street and national tour). He co-devised and starred in the original production of the Sondheim revue Putting It Together. In 2011, he starred in Cowardy Custard (national tour) with Dillie Keane. He co-starred with Tim Minchin in the first BBC Comedy Prom at the Royal Albert Hall in 2011: the last time that Kit and the Widow appeared on stage together. He starred annually in pantomime at Guildford, always playing the baddie. He made occasional appearances on the many BBC Radio 4 series, such as Just a Minute and Quote Unquote. He also presented one-off documentaries on off-beat subjects for Radio 4.

His musicals written with composer James McConnel included Writing Orlando (Barbican 1988) and Yusupov (Bridewell Theatre). He adapted the English version of Jacques Offenbach's La Belle Hélène (2006) directed by Laurent Pelly for English National Opera. His translation of The Bartered Bride for Charles Mackerras at the Royal Opera House was Grammy nominated, and he translated many other operas.

Original libretti include Varjak Paw (composer Julian Phillips). He adapted and produced 'The Caribbean Tempest', starring Kylie Minogue, in Barbados and Sydney 2000. He co-produced Shadwell Opera's Magic Flute at the Rosslyn Chapel, Edinburgh, (Herald Angel Award 2009). He collaborated in 2011 with Gifford's Circus, writing the lyrics to War And Peace.

His plays included Five O'Clock Angel at the Hampstead Theatre. He wrote regularly for Country Life magazine (2009 IPC's Writer of the Year). His radio play A La Villa Bab Azzoun, produced by Moving Theatre, won the 2009 Prix Europa. His work for military charities took him to the conflict in Kabul, as well as to Saudi, Africa, and the Far East.

His translation of The Merry Widow was in Opera North's 2010/11 season, transferring in July 2011 to the Sydney Opera House. Armonico Consort staged his 'Monteverdi's Flying Circus'. In 2011 he directed for Merry Opera his own adaptation of La belle Hélène, Troy Boy, and in 2012, his adaptation of La Traviata. He wrote and co-directed their production of The Magic Flute at the Riverside Studios, London, in 2013. His translation of The Magic Flute was revived in 2012–13 in the Scottish Opera's production, directed by Sir Thomas Allen. In 2013, he translated Salvatore Sciarrino's The Killing Flower (Royal Opera) for Music Theatre Wales. His libretto to Anthony Bolton's The Life and Death of Alexander Litvinenko received its first staging at Grange Park Opera in July 2021. His updated version of Donizetti's comic opera Le convenienze ed inconvenienze teatrali (also known in revivals since 1969 as Viva la mamma), but entitled by him Viva la Diva,   was performed in July 2022 as part of the Buxton International Festival. He worked as a performer and lyricist with James McConnel; the duo performed regularly at London cabaret venues as Kit and McConnel.

Personal life and death
In 1986, he married actress/academic Catherine Rabett; they had two children, Augusta and Rollo. The couple divorced in 2021. He lived in Norfolk and Cornwall. 

Hesketh-Harvey died on 1 February 2023, at the age of 65.

References

External links
 
 

1957 births
2023 deaths
20th-century British male musicians
21st-century British male musicians
Alumni of Clare College, Cambridge
British composers
British male screenwriters
British translators
Musicians from Kent
People from Royal Tunbridge Wells
People educated at Tonbridge School
Nyasaland people
British expatriates in Malawi
British male television writers